Davern is both a surname and a given name. Notable people with the name include:

Surname:
Brett Davern (born 1992), American actor
Don Davern (1935–1968), Irish politician
Kenny Davern (1935–2006), American jazz clarinetist
Michael Davern (1900–1973), Irish politician
Noel Davern (1945–2013), Irish politician

Given name:
Davern Williams (born 1980), American football player

See also
Davern Nunatak, nunatak of Mac. Robertson Land, Antarctica